Frank Palomino (born 1 December 1970) is a Peruvian footballer. He played in nine matches for the Peru national football team from 1994 to 2001. He was also part of Peru's squad for the 1997 Copa América tournament.

References

External links
 

1970 births
Living people
Peruvian footballers
Peru international footballers
Association football midfielders
People from Cusco